The fifth season of the American police procedural television series S.W.A.T. premiered on October 1, 2021, on CBS, for the 2021–22 television season, and ended on May 22, 2022. The season contained 22 episodes and the series 100th episode.

S.W.A.T. follows an elite Special Weapons and Tactics unit of the Los Angeles Police Department. The first half of the season aired on Fridays at 8:00 p.m., then later moved to Sundays at 10:00 p.m.

This was the last season to feature Lina Esco as a series regular.

Cast and characters

Main 
 Shemar Moore as Sergeant II Daniel "Hondo" Harrelson Jr.
 Alex Russell as Officer III James "Jim" Street
 Lina Esco as Officer III Christina "Chris" Alonso
 Kenny Johnson as Officer III+1 Dominique Luca 
 David Lim as Officer III Victor Tan
 Patrick St. Esprit as Commander Robert Hicks
 Jay Harrington as Sergeant II David "Deacon" Kay

Recurring 
 Bre Blair as Annie Kay
 Lou Ferrigno Jr. as Donovan Rocker
 David DeSantos as Rodrigo Sanchez
 Norma Kuhling as Nora Fowler
 Cathy Cahlin Ryan as Dr. Wendy Hughes
 David Rees Snell as Detective John Burrows
 Rochelle Aytes as Nichelle Carmichael

Guest 
 Obba Babatundé as Daniel Harrelson Sr.
 Debbie Allen as Charice Harrelson
 Wil Wheaton as Evan Whitlock
 Michael Beach as Leroy Henderson
 April Parker Jones as Winnie Harrelson
 Timothy V. Murphy as Arthur Novak
 Raymond Watanga as Hamid
 Leith M Burke as DHS Agent Gunther

Episodes 

The number in the "No. overall" column refers to the episode's number within the overall series, whereas the number in the "No. in season" column refers to the episode's number within this particular season. "Production code" refers to the order in which the episodes were produced while "U.S. viewers (millions)" refers to the number of viewers in the U.S. in millions who watched the episode as it was aired.

Production 
On April 15, 2021, CBS renewed the series for a fifth season.

Release
On May 19, 2021, it was announced that the series would move to Fridays at the 8:00 PM ET timeslot. The series leads into Magnum P.I.. On July 12, 2021, it was revealed that the season would premiere on October 1, 2021. After airing the first eight episodes, the series moved to Sundays at 10:00 p.m. after NCIS: Los Angeles.

Ratings

Home media

References

External links

2021 American television seasons
2022 American television seasons